The Act of Supremacy 1558 (1 Eliz 1 c 1), sometimes referred to as the Act of Supremacy 1559, is an Act of the Parliament of England, which replaced the original Act of Supremacy 1534, and  passed under the auspices of Elizabeth I. The 1534 Act was issued by Elizabeth's father, Henry VIII, which arrogated ecclesiastical authority to the monarchy, but which had been repealed by Mary I. Along with the Act of Uniformity 1558, the Act made up what is generally referred to as the Elizabethan Religious Settlement.

The Act remained in place until the 19th century, when some sections began to be repealed. By 1969, all provisions, bar section 8 (which still remains in force), had been repealed by various Acts, with the whole Act repealed in Northern Ireland between 1950 and 1953.

The Act
The Act revived ten Acts which Mary I had revoked, significantly clarified and narrowed the definition of what constituted heresy, and confirmed Elizabeth as Supreme Governor of the Church of England. Supreme Governor was a suitably equivocal title that made Elizabeth head of the Church without ever saying she was.  This was important because many felt that a woman could not rule the church.

The Act also made it a crime to assert the authority of any foreign prince, prelate, or other authority, and was aimed at abolishing the authority of the Pope in England. A third offence was high treason, punishable by death.

The Oath 
The Oath of Supremacy, imposed by the Act, provided for any person taking public or church office in England to swear allegiance to the monarch as Supreme Governor of the Church of England. Failure to so swear was a crime, although it did not become treason until 1562, when the Supremacy of the Crown Act 1562 made refusal to take the oath a treasonable offence. The Oath was later extended to include Members of Parliament and those studying at universities: all but one of the bishops lost their posts and a hundred fellows of Oxford colleges were deprived, as many dignitaries resigned rather than take the oath. The bishops who were removed from the ecclesiastical bench were  replaced by appointees who would agree to the reforms.

Text of the oath as published in 1559:

This had a specific impact on English Roman Catholics since it expressly indicates that they must forswear allegiance to Roman Catholicism, inasmuch as the Church of Rome was directly a foreign jurisdiction, power, superiority and authority. However, during the early years of her reign Elizabeth practised religious clemency and tolerance, which was an attempt to harmonise the state of affairs between the Roman Catholics and the Church of England. This was necessary for Elizabeth to establish her power fully, hold off threats of invasion from France and Spain, and to counter accusations of illegitimacy that plagued her early years. In the last twenty years of her reign, as the Pope issued official encouragement to topple, and even kill, Elizabeth, as Jesuits infiltrated England, and as the threat of Spanish invasion loomed, Catholics became targets for oppression. Later, Roman Catholic power within England waned (because Roman Catholics were forbidden to take public office and were slowly deprived of their lands and fortunes) but their influence grew until they attempted the Gunpowder Plot in 1605 – whereupon they were oppressed for nearly 200 years.

Text in force today 
Section 8 still remains in force in Great Britain, and reads as follows:

(The words at the end were repealed in 1641 by the Act 16 Ch.1 c.11.)

Related legislation
An Act to the same effect was passed in Ireland in the following year, the Act of Supremacy (Ireland) 1560 (2 Eliz.1 c. 1).

The Papal Jurisdiction Act 1560 remains in force in Scotland.

Another Act (1 Eliz.1 c.5) dealing with treason was passed in 1558, which made it treason to "compass" or "imagine" to deprive the Queen (or her heirs) of the Crown, or destroy her or her heirs, or levy war against them in their dominions, or depose them, or say that they are not or ought not to be the monarch.

Another Act (1 Eliz.1 c.6) dealt with sedition.

See also
Elizabethan Religious Settlement
List of Protestant martyrs of the English Reformation
Religion in the United Kingdom
Praemunire
High treason in the United Kingdom
Jesuits, etc. Act 1584

References

Citations

Notes

Bibliography

External links
Digital reproduction of the 1534 Act of Supremacy (26 Henry 8 c 1) on the Parliamentary Archives catalogue; no online copy of the 1558 Act of Supremacy (1 Eliz 1 c 1)

The Act of Supremacy – Full text

1559 in law
1559 in England
Acts of the Parliament of England (1485–1603)
Acts of the Parliament of England still in force
Constitutional laws of England
Elizabethan era
History of the Church of England
History of Catholicism in England
Christianity and law in the 16th century
1559 in Christianity
1558 in Christianity
1558 in law